The 1951 Swedish Ice Hockey Championship was the 28th season of the Swedish Ice Hockey Championship, the national championship of Sweden. Hammarby IF won the championship. This was the last season of the championship. It was also scheduled for 1952, but it was cancelled.

Tournament

Second round 
 VIK Västerås HK - Hammarby IF 3:5

Quarterfinals 
 Forshaga IF - Hammarby IF 1:2
 Tranebergs IF - Gävle GIK 3:1
 AIK - Sundbyberg 7:3

Semifinals 
 Hammarby IF - Tranebergs IF 3:1
 Södertälje SK - AIK 7:3

Final 
 Hammarby IF - Södertälje SK 3:2

External links
 Season on hockeyarchives.info

Cham
Swedish Ice Hockey Championship seasons